The River Carno is a river in Powys, mid Wales, and a tributary of the River Severn.

The river is named after the village of Carno, which is close to the source in the foothills of the Cambrian Mountains. From Carno it flows roughly parallel to the A470 road, past Clatter and through Pontdolgoch, before emptying into the Severn at Caersws.

Carno